Tabu Recordings is an independent Norwegian record label founded in 2003 in Oslo. It is owned by Tuba Records, a major Scandinavian independent music distributor. The label focuses on releasing products from the Norwegian metal bands.

Bands signed with Tabu Recordings
Battered
Benea Reach
Einherjer
Enslaved
Goat The Head
Funeral
Keep of Kalessin
Khold
Lumsk
Ram-Zet
Susperia
The Deviant
Vreid
Windir
She Said Destroy

See also
 List of record labels

External links
 

Norwegian independent record labels
Heavy metal record labels
Record labels established in 2003
Black metal record labels